The United States census of 1950, conducted by the Census Bureau, determined the resident population of the United States to be 150,697,361, an increase of 14.5 percent over the 131,669,275 persons enumerated during the 1940 census. 

This was the first census in which:
 More than one state recorded a population of over 10 million
 Every state and territory recorded a population of over 100,000
 All 100 largest cities recorded populations of over 100,000

On April 1, 2022, the National Archives and Records Administration released scanned census enumeration sheets to the general public, in accordance with the 72 year rule.

Census questions

The 1950 census collected the following information from all respondents:
 address
 whether house is on a farm
 name
 relationship to head of household
 race
 sex
 age
 marital status
 birthplace
 if foreign born, whether naturalized
 employment status
 hours worked in week
 occupation, industry and class of worker

In addition, a sample of individuals were asked additional questions covering income, marital history, fertility, and other topics.  Full documentation on the 1950 census, including census forms and a procedural history, is available from  the Integrated Public Use Microdata Series.

Data availability

Microdata from the 1950 census are freely available through the Integrated Public Use Microdata Series. Aggregate data for small areas, together with electronic boundary files, can be downloaded from the National Historical Geographic Information System. Personally identifiable information became available in April 2022.

On April 1, 2022, 72 years after the census was taken, the National Archives and Records Administration released scanned census enumeration sheets to the general public. Soon after, census data will also be made freely searchable by name at other websites.

State rankings

City rankings

References

External links
 Historic US Census data
 1951 U.S Census Report Contains 1950 census results

United States Census, 1950
United States census
United States